A finishing school focuses on teaching young women social graces and upper-class cultural rites as a preparation for entry into society. The name reflects that it follows on from ordinary school and is intended to complete the education, with classes primarily on deportment and etiquette, with academic subjects secondary.  It may consist of an intensive course, or a one-year programme. In the United States it is sometimes called a charm school.

Graeme Donald claims that the educational ladies' salons of the late 19th century led to the formal, finishing institutions evidenced in Switzerland around that time. At their peak, thousands of wealthy young women were sent to the dozens of finishing schools available. A primary goal was to teach students to acquire husbands.

The 1960s marked the decline of the finishing school. This can be attributed to the shifting conceptions of women's role in society, as well as succession issues within the typically family-run schools and sometimes commercial pressures driven by the high value of the properties the schools occupied. The 1990s saw a revival of the finishing school, although the business model has been radically altered.

By country

Switzerland
Switzerland was known for its private finishing schools. Most resided in the French-speaking cantons near Lake Geneva. The country was favoured because of its reputation as a healthful environment, its multi-lingual and cosmopolitan aura, and the region's political stability.

Notable examples

The finishing schools that made Switzerland renowned for such institutions were Brillantmont, founded in 1882, now an international secondary school that offers a 'grade 14' or graduate year of cultural studies, and Château Mont-Choisi, founded in 1885, which closed in 1995 or 1996. Both were in Lausanne. 
 The Maharani of Jaipur studied at Brillantmont. In her memoir, she claimed the time to be a happy one, in which she wrote letters to her later husband and pursued skiing and other sports. Actress Gene Tierney also attended Brillantmont, speaking only French and holidaying with fellow students in Norway and England.
  was attended by Carla Bruni-Sarkozy, as well as Princess Elena of Romania, Monique Lhuillier, actress Kitty Carlisle, Saudi scholar Mai Yamani and New York socialite Fabiola Beracasa-Beckman. It was one of the first Swiss finishing schools in the 19th century and in its early years a pioneer in secondary education. It was owned by an Italian family for five years prior to its closure due to financial reasons after over 100 years of educating women. Like many of its peers it adopted a serious secondary education program in the early 20th century.
 Institut Alpin Videmanette in Rougemont was attended by Diana, Princess of Wales, Tiggy Legge-Bourke and Tamara Mellon. Diana was sent to Alpin Videmanette by her father after failing all her O-Levels. She had met the Prince of Wales that year.
 Mon Fertile, in Tolochenaz, educated Camilla, Queen Consort and Ingrid Detter de Lupis Frankopan.
 Queen Anne-Marie of Greece attended Institut Le Mesnil after completing her high school education at the nearby Le Chatelard School, also in Montreux. Le Mesnil, owned by the Navarro family, closed in 2004. Le Chatelard today offers education in the American model of junior high and high school up to the age of 17. They today include Savoir Vivre and culinary courses along the lines of the traditional Finishing Schools but these are in supplement not in replacement of academic subjects. 
 Institut Château Beau-Cedre was founded in 1953 in Clarens and was housed in a castle that had paintings on the walls. The school had flourished through the 1990s but closed in 2003 as a full-time ladies college. It had educated young women in the UK and US school programs from 14–18 years allowing many to secure places at universities around the world and also offered post graduate 'finishing' style course for 16–23 year olds.  Queen Elizabeth briefly entertained the thought of sending Princess Anne to Château Beau-Cedre in the late 1960s, but elected not to. After the college head retired in 2003 the school continued to host business courses on an ad hoc basis. The school will re-open as an international business school in 2020 admitting male and female students studying business in a gap year before university or as a post graduate.
 Vieux Chalet in Château-d'Œx was a finishing school run by the parents of the current owner. Vieux Chalet is now a hotel and was for several years a cookery school after closing as a finishing school with a broader curriculum. 
 Le Manoir, in Lausanne, educated British secret agent Vera Atkins and a sister of the first King of the Albanians. It had a private beach and students were taken skiing in St Moritz.
 The last remaining traditional Swiss finishing school that does not teach academic subjects is Institut Villa Pierrefeu, in Glion, which was founded in 1954. This now offers courses of 1 to 6 weeks in length on a variety of cultural subjects.
 The Institute Surval Mont Fleuri that became Surval Montreux in 2012 was founded in the mid-20th century as a finishing school admitting pupils from the age of 16 to 24. It developed an academic program following either the UK or US school systems that could be taken as a stand-alone option or precursor to the finishing program. In later years it accepted students aged 13–19 for high school and 16–24 for finishing until the early 2010s when the curriculum changed to focus on high school teaching for an international audience. A cultural enrichment course was added for students aged 16–19 years old in a modernised revival of the traditional finishing certificate concentrating on languages, literary studies and business skills.
The Swiss Institute of Etiquette and Protocol (SIEP) was founded in 2021. It offers private finishing courses to adults.  Courses take place at SIEP's premises on the shores of Lake Geneva or at clients' accommodation, in Switzerland and internationally.  SIEP also delivers a Corporate Programme and a Children and Youth Programme.

Great Britain
 In London there were a number of schools in the 20th century including the Cygnet's House, the Monkey Club, St James and Lucie Clayton. The latter two merged in 2005 to become St James and Lucie Clayton College and were joined by a third, Queens (a secretarial college), to become the current Quest Professional.  It is in London's Victoria district and offers business administration courses for students aged 16–25 years old.  It is coeducational.
 The Campana school in Surrey closed in the 1990s. 
 Eggleston Hall was located in County Durham and taught young ladies aged 16–20 from the 1960s until the late 1980s.
 Evendine Court in Malvern began as a small school in the late 19th century teaching young ladies the duties of their families' household staff, by requiring them to complete domestic work themselves. Courses typically lasted six weeks. By 1900, the school had become popular.  It extended to several buildings and included a working dairy farm to teach practical farming. During the Second World War it adopted more traditional finishing school subjects for young women unable to travel to Europe. Pupil numbers remained high until the mid-1990s, with a broader curriculum covering cordon bleu cookery, self presentation, and secretarial skills. It closed in 1998.
 Paddock Wood Finishing School in Lightwater, Surrey, was founded by a second world war Monegasque-French resistance leader and charity worker. It ran from the 1940s until 1982 after the founder stumbled upon a large clientele of diplomat's children who wanted to perfect their English. Despite high student numbers in the 1970s, the Iranian Revolution and political turmoil in Central and South America in the late 1970s and early 1980s saw pupil numbers fall dramatically in just a couple of years prior to its closure. 
 Winkfield Place in Ascot specialised in culinary expertise and moved to a new location in Surrey around 1990 when it joined with Moor Park Finishing School before Moor Park closed in 1998/99. Winkfield Place was founded by women's educator Constance Spry as a flower arranging and domestic science school and had an international reputation. It taught girls across three terms of an academic year with the possibility of studying Le Cordon Bleu courses with Rosemary Hume in a fourth term.
 Harrow House/Rannies was located in Eastbourne and became a specialist culinary school.

About a decade after these schools had closed a diverse group of public relations and image consultancy firms started to appear in London offering largely 1- or 2-day finishing courses and social skills at commercial rate fees far higher that those charged by the colleges that closed mostly by the millennium (Lucie Clayton had been the exception). They often appeal to new international money and corporate clientele. Some partner with 5 star hotels to offer their courses but none are taught by a body of teaching staff in a school or college environment like their predecessors. The model is more business and commercial than before.

The old finishing schools were stand-alone organisations that lasted 15–50 years and were often family run. Curricula varied between schools based on the proprietor's philosophy, much like the British private school model of the 18th and 19th centuries. Some schools offered some O-level and A-level courses or recognised arts and languages certificates. They sometimes allowed pupils to retake a course they may not have passed at secondary school level.  They often taught languages and commercially applicable skills, such as cooking, secretarial and later business studies with the aim of broadening the students horizons from formal schooling education.

United States

Through much of their history, American finishing schools emphasised social graces and de-emphasised scholarship: society encouraged a polished young lady to hide her intellectual prowess for fear of frightening away suitors. For instance, Miss Porter's School in 1843 advertised itself as Miss Porter's Finishing School for Young Ladies—even though its founder was a noted scholar offering a rigorous curriculum that educated the illustrious classicist Edith Hamilton.

Today, with a new cultural climate and a different attitude to the role of women, the situation has reversed: Miss Porter's School downplays its origins as a finishing school, and emphasises the rigour of its academics. Likewise, Finch College on Manhattan's Upper East Side was "one of the most famed of U.S. girls' finishing schools", but its last president chose to describe it as a liberal arts college, offering academics as rigorous as Barnard or Bryn Mawr. It closed in 1976.

The term finishing school is occasionally used, or misused, in American parlance to refer to certain small women's colleges, primarily on the East Coast, that were once known for preparing their female students for marriage. Since the 1960s, many of these schools have closed as a result of financial difficulties.  These stemmed from changing societal norms, which made it easier for women to pursue academic and professional paths.

In literature

The Finishing School, a 2004 novel by Scottish author Muriel Spark, concerns 'College Sunrise', a present-day finishing school in Ouchy on the banks of Lake Geneva near Lausanne in Switzerland. Unlike the traditional finishing schools, the one in this novel is mixed-sex.

References

School types
Women and education